is a Japanese rugby union player who plays as a prop.

In his home country he plays for Yamaha Júbilo whom he joined in 2013.   He was also named in the first ever  squad which will compete in Super Rugby from the 2016 season.

References

1990 births
Living people
Japanese rugby union players
Rugby union props
Shizuoka Blue Revs players
Sunwolves players
People from Shiga Prefecture
Japan international rugby union players
Kobelco Kobe Steelers players